Hugo Häring (11 May 1882 – 17 May 1958) was a German architect and architectural writer best known for his writings on "organic architecture", and as a figure in architectural debates about functionalism in the 1920s and 1930s, though he had an important role as an expressionist architect.

Häring was born in Biberach an der Riß, in the Kingdom of Württemberg.  A student of the great Theodor Fischer, he took the view that each building should be uniquely developed according to the specific demands of the site and client.  Few of Häring's designs were built but he was a strong influence on his friend and colleague Hans Scharoun.  One built design was a contribution to the Siemensstadt housing project in Berlin from 1929 through 1931, which was master-planned by Scharoun.

Häring was a founding member of both The Ring and CIAM. He was married to actress Emilia Unda in 1918. the couple later divorced and he married actress Roma Bahn in 1950. He died in Göppingen, aged 76.

Buildings 
 1922–1928: Gut Garkau in Scharbeutz
 1926/1927: Buildings in the Onkel-Tom-Siedlung in Berlin-Zehlendorf
 1929/1930: Ring-Siedlung in Berlin-Siemensstadt
 1929–1931: Prinzenallee/Gotenburger Straße and Stockholmer Straße in Berlin-Gesundbrunnen
 1931/1932: Duplex Vietingergasse 71/72 in  the Wiener Werkbundsiedlung in Vienna-Lainz
 1931/1932: Doppelhaus Engelbrechtweg 4 in the Wiener Werkbundsiedlung] in Vienna-Lainz (1945 destroyed, new built by Roland Rainer)
 1938: Landhaus v. Prittwitz in Tutzing
 1950: Hugo-Häring-Häuser in Biberach an der Riß

Bibliography

M. Aschenbrenner, P. Blundell-Jones, Hugo Häring – the Organic versus the Geometric, Edition Axel Menges, 1999
P. Blundell-Jones, Hugo Häring – New Buildings, Cambridge University Press, 2003
 Jose-Manuel GARCÍA ROIG, "Tres arquitectos alemanes. Bruno Taut. Hugo Häring. Martin Wagner", Valladolid (Spain), 2004, Universidad de Valladolid, Secretariado de Publicaciones

External links
Brief description of Haring's career
Gut Garkau

1882 births
1958 deaths
People from Biberach an der Riss
People from the Kingdom of Württemberg
Expressionist architects
20th-century German architects
Modernist architects from Germany
Organic architecture
Congrès International d'Architecture Moderne members
German architecture writers
German male non-fiction writers